Yang Hom is a tambon (subdistrict) of Khun Tan District, in Chiang Rai Province, Thailand. In 2014 it had a population of 11,316 people.

Administration

Central administration
The tambon is divided into 21 administrative villages (mubans).

Local administration
The subdistrict is covered by the subdistrict municipality (thesaban tambon) Yang Hom (เทศบาลตำบลยางฮอม)

References

External links
Thaitambon.com on Yang Hom (Thai)
Yang Hom municipality (Thai)

Tambon of Chiang Rai province
Populated places in Chiang Rai province